Brant Lake is located by Brant Lake, New York. Fish species present in the lake are largemouth bass, smallmouth bass, brown trout, yellow perch, chain pickerel, smelt, black crappie, rainbow trout, sunfish, and brown bullhead. There is a state owned hard surface ramp located 1 mile northeast of the hamlet of Brant Lake.

References

Lakes of New York (state)
Lakes of Warren County, New York